Why Should I Love You? is the name of multiple songs:

 "Why Should I Love You?" from the album The Red Shoes by Kate Bush
 "Why Should I Love You?" by The Harptones
 "Why Should I Love You?" from the album Glad Music by Stevie Moore
 "Why Should I Love You?" by The Four Lads